Antonio Agustín y Albanell (1516–1586), also referred to as Augustinus, was a Spanish Humanist historian, jurist, and Roman Catholic archbishop of Tarragona, who pioneered the historical research of the sources of canon law.

Life
Born in Zaragoza, Agustín studied law and classical literature in Alcalá, Salamanca, Padua and Bologna, notably as a pupil of Andrea Alciati.

With his nomination as an auditor of the Sacra Rota Romana in 1544, Agustín started his ecclesiastical career, which saw him become a papal nuncio in 1554/55. On 21 Dec 1557, he was consecrated bishop by Giovanni Giacomo Barba - Bishop of Terni, with Cesare Cibo - Archbishop of Turin, and Ferdinando Pandolfini - Bishop of Troia, serving as co-consecrators. In 1556, he was named Bishop of Alife, and then named Bishop of Lleida in 1561. After participating in the Council of Trient in 1561–63, he was named Archbishop of Tarragona in 1576.

Work
Agustín is now primarily remembered as the first canon law historian; Peter Landau counts him among the other authors that enabled us to consider the 16th century the founding age of the science of history.

His first main work, Emendationum et opinionum libri IV, proposed the now widely accepted thesis that the Littera Florentina manuscript was the source for all other copies of the Pandects. This undermined the authority, fundamental to medieval Roman law, of the Latin Vulgate text of the Pandects.

Agustín's other main historical works are:
 Antiquae Collectionis Decretalium (1576)
 De Emendatione Gratiani dialogorum libri duo (1587), a textual criticism of the Gratian Decree
 Epitome iuris pontificii veteris (1587/1611), a compendium of canon law prior to Innocent III
 De quibusdam veteris canonum ecclesiasticorum collectoribus iudicium ac censura (1611, posthumously published), a history of the pre-Gratian sources of ecclesiastical law

Notes

References
 
 «Agustí i Albanell, Antoni, 1517-1586»  Antics Posseïdors (Universitat de Barcelona. CRAI Biblioteca de Reserva)

1516 births
1586 deaths
People from Zaragoza
Historians of the Catholic Church
16th-century Spanish jurists
Spanish historians of religion
Bishops of Lleida
Archbishops of Tarragona
16th-century Roman Catholic archbishops in Spain
Canon law jurists
Spanish Latinists
University of Salamanca alumni